Sonja Kireta (born 31 October 1976 in Zagreb, SFR Yugoslavia) is a former Croatian female basketball player.

External links
Profile at eurobasket.com

1976 births
Living people
Basketball players from Zagreb
Croatian women's basketball players
Centers (basketball)
Mediterranean Games gold medalists for Croatia
Mediterranean Games medalists in basketball
Competitors at the 1997 Mediterranean Games
20th-century Croatian women